Maryborough Airport  is located approximately  north of the town centre. It serves as a small regional airport serving Maryborough and nearby townships. However, increasing competition with Hervey Bay Airport has led to a decrease in commercial air traffic.

The airport is primarily used by the Maryborough Aero Club, a flight school and (in development) an aviation museum.

The airport was used by the Royal Australian Air Force during World War II; the buildings constructed for the RAAF are now listed on the Queensland Heritage Register.

See also
 List of airports in Queensland

References

External links

Airports in Queensland
Maryborough, Queensland